Chase Henry Hoyt (born August 29, 1980) is an American film, television, and stage actor.

Biography 

Hoyt was born in Tucson, Arizona to Karen Carol McGurren and Robert Quentin Hoyt. Hoyt attended boarding school at Lawrence Academy in Groton, Massachusetts. In his senior year, because it was mandatory to graduate, Hoyt took his first theater class.  After graduating, he returned home, where he attended the University of Arizona, majoring in business.

In 2001, Hoyt left college to study theater at the Royal Academy of Dramatic Art in London, England.  He was mentored by Greg de Polnay, and appeared in two Shakespearean plays, King John, and All's Well that Ends Well.  After his training, He moved to Los Angeles and studied under coach Stephen Book.

Hoyt first worked as an extra on the TV shows American Dreams, and Eve (U.S. TV series).  He also co-starred on the TV shows, Star Trek: Enterprise, and Numb3rs.  While auditioning for a Hallmark movie, he was asked to read for another part, and found himself playing the son of James Gammon in the Hallmark made for TV movie, What I did For Love.  Hoyt was in the independent film, Alien 51, opposite Heidi Fleiss.

Hoyt has also appeared in numerous short and feature films, including "Out of the Shadows," "Afterlife," and "The Yellow Butterfly," which has won domestic and international awards.  Aside from theatrical work, In 2005, Hoyt appeared on the popular show, Fear Factor, where he and his teammate won the competition after eating over one hundred live African stink beetles and leeches, and crashing two Camaros on a Los Angeles race track.

Filmography 
 Thule (2010) - Lt. Grady, Co-producer
 What I Did for Love (2006) - Zeb Ryder
 Fear Factor (2005) - Contestant/Himself
 Dr. Chopper (2005) - Reese
 Numb3rs (2005) - Paparazzi #1
 Star Trek: Enterprise (2005) - Starfleet Lieutenant
 Legion of the Dead (2005) - Justin
 The Aviator (2004) - Usher
 Alien 51 (2004) - Doctor Psychobilly
 Eve (U.S. TV series) (2003) - Lounge Drunk
 American Dreams (2003) - Lacrosse Captain
 American Tragedy (2000) - Attorney
 The Translator (2000) - Dock Boy

References 
 Fear Factor Review/interview

External links
 
 Arizona Daily Star Article
 What I Did for Love review
 A Midsummer Night's Dream Award
 Chase Hoyt Official Website

1980 births
American male actors
Living people
University of Arizona alumni